Gallant Schemer was launched in 1799 at Falmouth. A French privateer captured her in 1805, but she was back in British hands by 1808. She then traded with South America and the Mediterranean. A French privateer captured her in 1813.

Career
Gallant Schemer came into Bristol in July 1801 from Nevis. Tobin, Pinney, and Tobin put her up for sale a month later, advertising her as having been "altered at Falmouth last year". She sailed to Nevis with Snow, master, and was again advertised for sale, this time being advertised as "built at Falmouth about two years ago." Thomas King purchased her and advertised her as sailing for Surinam with Williams, master, in July 1804, and for Jamaica, in August 1805 with Gardner, master.

She first appeared in Lloyd's Register (LR) in 1803.

In February 1806 Lloyd's List reported that Gallant Schemer, Gardner, master, had been captured while sailing from Bristol to Jamaica. Her captor had carried her into Guadeloupe.

However, Gallant Schemer returned to British ownership. Although there is no mention in Lloyd's List or the London Gazette of a recapture of a vessel by that name, Lloyd's Register for 1808 showed Gallant Schemer with Reach, master, Bourgoyne, owner, and trade London–Gibraltar. In December 1811, she was driven ashore at Sheerness, Kent, England, during a voyage from Smyrna, Greece, to London.

Fate
On 1 October 1813 the French privateer , after a brief exchange of gunfire, captured Gallant Schemer, Clement Worts, master, which had been sailing from Smyrna. She had been carrying silk, "Near eastern antiques", gaiac wood, and sponges. Babiole brought her into Ajaccio, Corsica, on 11 November.

Notes, citations, and references
Notes

Citations

References
 
 
 

1799 ships
Age of Sail merchant ships of England
Captured ships
Shipwrecks in the North Sea
Maritime incidents in 1811